Chevannes is the name or part of the name of the following communes in France:

Chevannes, Côte-d'Or, in the Côte-d'Or department
Chevannes, Essonne, in the Essonne department
Chevannes, Loiret, in the Loiret department
Chevannes, Yonne, in the Yonne department
Billy-Chevannes, in the Nièvre department
Chevannes-Changy, in the Nièvre department
 see also Chavannes